Kamil Vacek (born 18 May 1987) is a Czech footballer who plays as a midfielder for FK Pardubice.

Club career
In 2011, he signed for Chievo making his debut in Serie A on 11 September, in a 2–2 draw against Novara. In last matchday of season, scored his only goal in Italy causing relegation - to Serie B - for Lecce.

On 28 October 2012, in a match against Napoli, was sent off after two yellow cards. In 2013 he returns in Czech Republic.

On 30 August 2017, he signed a contract with Śląsk Wrocław.

Vacek returned home and signed with Bohemians 1905 half season loan deal on 28 January 2019 from his Danish club OB. On 1 July 2019 OB announced, that they had terminated the contract of the player by mutual consent and that he would continue his career at Bohemians 1905.

Honours
Czech Supercup: 2010
Czech First League Winner: 2009–10
Czech First League runner-up: 2007–08, 2008–09, 2010–11

References

External links
 
 Kamil Vacek at FAČR 
 
 
 

1987 births
Living people
Czech footballers
Czech Republic under-21 international footballers
Czech Republic international footballers
SK Sigma Olomouc players
Arminia Bielefeld players
AC Sparta Prague players
A.C. ChievoVerona players
FK Mladá Boleslav players
Piast Gliwice players
Śląsk Wrocław players
Maccabi Haifa F.C. players
Odense Boldklub players
Bohemians 1905 players
Czech expatriate footballers
Expatriate footballers in Germany
Expatriate footballers in Italy
Expatriate footballers in Poland
Expatriate footballers in Israel
Czech expatriate sportspeople in Germany
Czech expatriate sportspeople in Italy
Czech expatriate sportspeople in Poland
Czech expatriate sportspeople in Israel
Bundesliga players
Czech First League players
Serie A players
Ekstraklasa players
Danish Superliga players
Association football midfielders
Israeli Premier League players
Expatriate men's footballers in Denmark
Czech expatriate sportspeople in Denmark
People from Ústí nad Orlicí
FK Pardubice players
Czech Republic youth international footballers
Sportspeople from the Pardubice Region